The Album is the third studio album by American singer Teyana Taylor. The album was released on June 19, 2020, through GOOD Music and Def Jam Recordings, almost exactly two years after her 8 track second album K.T.S.E. The album was preceded by the release of six singles "How You Want It?", "Morning", "We Got Love", "Made It", "Bare wit Me" and "Wake Up Love". The 23-track album features guest appearances from Erykah Badu, Kehlani, Big Sean, Lauryn Hill, Future, Rick Ross, Quavo, and Missy Elliott. Taylor's husband, Iman Shumpert and their daughter Junie also appear.

Background and recording
Following the release of her second studio album K.T.S.E. (2018), Taylor announced that she would be updating the album and re-releasing it in June or July. After a Twitter user asked for the whereabouts of her updated album, Taylor revealed that her hopes for a new version had been deflated. "I guess we ain't getting one," she bluntly replied. Minutes later, Taylor sent a second tweet explaining how she intends to release the updated music. "A lot of clearance issues, shit takes time. At this point I will leave album the way it is & will just debut the extended records thru my visuals!" she said. In October 2019, Taylor spoke to Entertainment Weekly that she was working on a new album titled, The Album after many disappointments and frustrations with her previous record. She revealed that she took more creative control on the album in comparison to K.T.S.E., which had a verse cut without her knowledge and was shorter than she wanted. She said that she was ready to "take full accountability that I need to be 110 percent on everything that I do" and not let anyone compromise her creative vision. She revealed that for the album, she was focused on "fixing what didn't work the first time, getting a better rollout, more records, longer records. . . just giving everybody more." She aimed to release new music by the next year.

Release and controversy
Two days prior to the album's release, Taylor celebrated her Juneteenth release with an album listening party, alongside friends like Cardi B, Lena Waithe, Karrueche Tran, and Winnie Harlow. Taylor sparked controversy and was criticized by social media outlets after photos from the event showed most attendees with their masks partially off or not on at all despite the restrictions to keep them on while being in public during the COVID-19 pandemic in the United States. Taylor went on to address the apparent lack of masks: "... For all the internet covid experts 🙄😜we had REAL Covid Police & medics that made sure we were all safe and able to have a good time all while following covid regulations," she wrote. "Custom '#TheAlbum' Masks and hazmat suits were also provided!" Taylor shed more light on the situation during a video interview with Angie Martinez, doubling down on her claims that she and her team took extra steps to ensure guests' safety. 

Taylor went on to say it was a 60-person party in a 15,000-feet house with a lot of activity taking place outside. She also said there were "COVID prevention people" at the event. "Pretty much the 'COVID police' ... You could not even walk in the house without putting on your HAZMAT suit and your mask," Taylor said. "... We were extremely safe."

Taylor explained why she decided to release the album on Juneteenth:

Composition
Complexs Eric Diep summarized the album: "The album is broken up by "studio" rooms (which appropriately spell out "album" reading from top to bottom). At 23 songs in length, it is significantly longer than Taylor's previous album, K.T.S.E., which was eight songs. Taylor was part of G.O.O.D. Music's seven-song album rollout, promising to re-release an updated version of K.T.S.E., but it never materialized. From those sessions, "We Got Love" appears at the end of The Album, replacing Kanye West with her doing his verse. Lauryn Hill speaks about wealth and abundance at the end". Taylor's husband Iman Shumpert appears on "Wake Up Love", while their daughter Junie is featured on "Come Back to Me."

Commercial performance
The Album debuted at number eight on the US Billboard 200 chart, earning 32,000 album-equivalent units (including pure album sales of 4,000 copies) in its first week. This became Taylor's first US top-ten debut on the chart.

Track listing

Notes
  signifies a co-producer
  signifies an additional producer
 Laruyn Hill is credited as "Ms. Lauryn Hill" on digital platforms.
 "Intro" features spoken word by Iman Shumpert, and  background vocals by Corey Cooper.
 "Wake Up Love" features additional vocals by Kes Kross.
 "Boomin" features additional vocals by Timbaland.
 "Bad" features additional vocals by Barryon Nembhard.
 "We Got Love" features additional vocals by Sharlene Hector, Richard Adlam, Louise Clare Marshall, Hal Ritson and Brendan Reilly.

Sample credits
 "Come Back to Me" contains uncredited samples of “You Don't Know My Name”, written by Alicia Keys, Kanye West, Harold Lilly, J. R. Bailey, Mel Kent and Ken Williams, and performed by Keys.
 "Lowkey" contains samples of "Next Lifetime", written by Erica Wright and Scott Anthony, and performed by Erykah Badu.
 "Boomin" contains an interpolation of "808", written by Robert Kelly and Natina Reed, and performed by Blaque.
 "69" contains samples of "Borderline With My Atoms", written by Naomi Saalfield, Raymond Komba, Perrin Moss and Simon Mavin, and performed by Hiatus Kaiyote.
 "Still" contains elements of "Acting", written by Roberto Burgos and Valerie Cooper, and performed by Sweet Trip.
 "Ever Ever" contains samples of "The Sweetest Thing", written by Lauryn Hill and Wyclef Jean, and performed by Refugee Camp All-Stars from the film soundtrack of Love Jones.
 "Try Again" contains interpolations to the song of the same name, written by Timothy Mosley and Stephen Garett, and performed by Aaliyah.
 "Friends" contains elements of "Just Friends (Sunny)", written by Taalib Johnson, Carvin Haggins and Bobby Hebb, and performed by Musiq Soulchild.
 "How You Want It" contains samples of "What You Want", written by Mason Betha, Sean Combs, Nashiem Myrick and Keisha Spivey, and performed by Mase, which also samples "Right On for the Darkness", written and performed by Curtis Mayfield.
 "Made It" contains interpolations of "Back That Azz Up", written by Terius Gray, Byron Thomas and Dwayne Carter, and performed by Juvenile; and samples of "He'll Never Love You Like I Do", written by Walter Sigler, James Sigler and Morris Bailey, and performed by The Spinners.
 "We Got Love" contains a sample of "We've Got Love (You Better Believe It)", written by Ronald Preyer, Vernon Bullock, Charles Ingersoll and Robert Solomon, and performed by The Younghearts.

Credits and personnel
Credits adapted from Tidal and YouTube.

Performance

 Teyana Taylor – primary artist
 Iman Shumpert – Spoken word , vocals 
 Rick Ross – vocals 
 Kes Kross – vocals 
 Erykah Badu – vocals 
 Quavo – vocals 
 Kehlani – vocals 
 Missy Elliott – vocals 
 Future – vocals 
 DaVido – vocals 
 Big Sean – vocals 
 King Combs – vocals 
 Lauryn Hill – vocals 
 Brendan Reilly – vocals 
 Hal Ritson – vocals 
 Louise Clare Marshall – vocals 
 Richard Adlam – vocals 
 Sharlene Hector – vocals 
 Corey Cooper – background vocals 
 Barryon Nembhard – background vocals

Instrumentation

 Bassman – bass guitar 
 Travis Marsh – guitar , keyboards , synth 
 Carrington Brown – drums , keyboards , percussion 
 Ayo N Keyz – drums , bass guitar , keyboards 
 David Harris – drums 
 Gabriel Lambrinth – guitar 
 Ricky Ramos – guitar 
 Zo – keyboards 
 Angel Lopez – bass guitar , drums , keyboards 
 Federico Vindver – bass guitar , drums , keyboards 
 Jordan Mosley – keyboards 
 Justin Mosley – keyboards 
 Timbaland – percussion 
 Sean Alaric – bass guitar , drums , guitar , keyboards 
 MIXX – drums 
 Rob Harris – guitar 
 Hal Ritson – keyboards 
 Richard Adlam – keyboards 
 Ben Somers – saxophone 
 Neil Waters – trumpet 
 Bizness Boi – drums 
 Ninety Four – 
 Cardiak – guitar 
 Mike Dean – bass guitar , guitar 
 Ray Keys – keyboards 
 Michael Blackburn — guitar 
 Seven Aurelius – keyboards 
 Johan Lenox – string arranger 
 Yasmeen Al-Mazeedi – violin

Production

 Carrington Brown – production , additional production 
 Bassman – production , additional production 
 MIXX – production , additional production 
 DJ Camper – production 
 Cardiak – production 
 Swiff D – production 
 Ayo N Keyz – production 
 Murda Beatz – production 
 Teyana Taylor – production 
 Louis Gold – production 
 Tune Da Rula – production 
 Timbaland – production 
 Bongo BytheWay – production 
 Bizness Boi – production 
 Ninety Four – production 
 Mike Dean – production 
 Ray Keys – production 
 Nova Wav – production 
 Travis Marsh – production 
 Wallis Lane – production 
 Scribz – production 
 Sean Momberger – production 
 BoogzDaBeast – production , co-production 
 Hitmaka – production 
 Kanye West – production 
 Seven Aurelius – production 
 Hal Ritson – additional production 
 Richard Adlam – additional production 
 Sean Alaric – additional production 
 Johan Lenox – additional production 
 Angel Lopez – co-production 
 Federico Vindver – co-production 
 Jordan Mosley – co-production 
 Justin Mosley – co-production 
 Marco Mavy – co-production 
 Sangria (Josh Terrelle) – co-production 
 U.N.I. – co-production 
 E*vax – co-production

Technical

 Colin Leonard – mastering 
 Jaycen Joshua – mixing 
 Andrew Dawson – mixing , 
 Jess Jackson – mixing 
 Mike Snell – vocal mixing , recording 
 MIXX – recording 
 Joel White – recording 
 Jenna Felsenthal – recording assistance 
 DJ Riggins – mixing assistance 
 Jacob Richards – mixing assistance 
 Mike Seaberg – mixing assistance 
 Sean Solymar – mixing assistance , recording assistance 

Notes
 Ayo N Keyz are credited together in production and instrumentation.

Charts

References

2020 albums
Teyana Taylor albums
Def Jam Recordings albums
GOOD Music albums
Albums produced by Mike Dean (record producer)
Albums produced by Cardiak
Albums produced by Hitmaka
Albums produced by Kanye West
Albums produced by Timbaland
Albums produced by Murda Beatz
Albums produced by E*vax